Samuel Aragaw is a French Polynesian long-distance runner who has represented French Polynesia at the Pacific Games.

Aragaw is originally from Africa, and moved to French Polynesia in 2015.

In 2017 he won the Polynesian 10,000m championship. He won again in 2018.

At the 2019 Pacific Games in Apia he won gold in the 5,000m and silver in the half-marathon.

References

Living people
French Polynesian long-distance runners
Year of birth missing (living people)